Palaquium mindanaense is a species of plant in the family Sapotaceae. It is endemic to the Philippines, where it is confined to Mindanao.

References

mindanaense
Endemic flora of the Philippines
Flora of Mindanao
Taxonomy articles created by Polbot
Taxa named by Elmer Drew Merrill

Critically endangered flora of Asia